The 2006 Catalan motorcycle Grand Prix was the seventh round of the 2006 MotoGP Championship. It took place on the weekend of 16–18 June 2006 at the Circuit de Catalunya located in Montmeló, Catalonia, Spain.

The MotoGP race was initially red flagged after a crash at the first corner, caused by Loris Capirossi's Ducati making contact with teammate Sete Gibernau's front brake lever. Six riders were involved; John Hopkins, Dani Pedrosa and Randy de Puniet were able to take the restart, while Gibernau, Capirossi and Marco Melandri were not. After the second start was aborted due to an issue with Chris Vermeulen's Suzuki on the grid, the grid reformed for a third time and the race was shortened from 25 laps to 24.

MotoGP classification

250 cc classification

125 cc classification

Championship standings after the race (MotoGP)

Below are the standings for the top five riders and constructors after round seven has concluded.

Riders' Championship standings

Constructors' Championship standings

 Note: Only the top five positions are included for both sets of standings.

References

Catalan motorcycle Grand Prix
Catalan
Catalan Motorcycle Grand Prix
motorcycle